"What a Catch, Donnie" is Fall Out Boy's second digital download single and third radio single from their fourth studio album Folie à Deux (2008). It was first released as part of the buildup to the new album on iTunes on October 14, 2008, and charted on the US and Canadian singles charts. The track features numerous musicians performing cameo appearances in the song, singing lines from past Fall Out Boy songs. It is to date the band's longest song. Bassist and lyricist Pete Wentz has said that he wrote the song to remind himself of vocalist and guitarist Patrick Stump. Fall Out Boy played the song live on Late Night with Jimmy Fallon.

Music video
The music video was dedicated to Atlanta rapper Dolla who was shot and killed a few months before the song's release.
The band shot the video for the song on July 1, 2009, with Alan Ferguson. On June 30, bassist Pete Wentz posted on his Twitter that the band had 'wrapped up' a video for "What a Catch, Donnie". On July 2, guitarist Joe Trohman stated via Twitter that they had finished shooting the video, editing will take place in the next couple days, and the video was released on MTV on August 6, 2009.

The video includes Spencer Smith and Brendon Urie from Panic! at the Disco. The two also appeared in the official music video for Fall Out Boy's "A Little Less Sixteen Candles, a Little More "Touch Me"" as some of the dandies, and were featured in the video for "Headfirst Slide into Cooperstown on a Bad Bet".

Pete Wentz said in a press statement: -
"It is my time to say that we haven't done a video like this before, a video dedicated to someone's death, the death of our best friend and rapper, Dolla (Roderick Anthony Burton II). We hope to shoot the video for 'What a Catch, Donnie' in the same place he was shot and also bring our friends round for the climax."

The official music video was released August 7, 2009, on MTV, MTV2, mtvU, and MTV Hits.

The video depicts lead singer Patrick Stump alone at sea trying to find his way home. Throughout most of the video he is fishing, reading in his cabin, playing the piano and suffering from loneliness. Eventually, he finds a seagull trapped in ropes on his ship. He frees and befriends the bird and so the two set sail together and Patrick is no longer lonely. At 0:37 a carousel horse can be seen on deck (from "America's Suitehearts"). Towards the end of the video, Patrick starts to fish again but finds strange objects such as deer antlers (from Antler Boy in "Sugar, We're Goin Down"), a black and green striped jacket (the jacket Patrick wore in "Dance, Dance"), and a bass drum (one of Andy Hurley's drums). Finally, he comes across a sign featuring the letters F, O, and B (the sign from "Thnks fr th Mmrs"). He then looks up and spots a white casket (from "This Ain't a Scene, It's an Arms Race") as well as a sinking ship. He immediately turns the boat around to rescue the survivors on the lifeboats (who include Joe Trohman, Andy Hurley, Spencer Smith, Brendon Urie, and everyone else (except Pete Wentz) who has worked with Fall Out Boy over the past few years). After all of the survivors are on the boat celebrating because they were rescued, Patrick looks out at the sinking ship. In the top right corner, a man assumed to be the captain in a white uniform is seen saluting. This man is supposedly Pete Wentz, and he had a close up in the original video but was edited out. Once all of the survivors are on the boat, and getting closer to shore, Patrick sets free his Seagull friend and watches him fly off with his family into the coast. At the end of the song it also depicts some of their greatest hits. In the background they sing chorus lines from their songs "Headfirst Slide Into Cooperstown On a Bad Bet", "Grand Theft Autumn/Where Is Your Boy", "Sugar We're Goin Down", "Dance, Dance", "This Ain't a Scene, It's an Arms Race", "Thnks fr th Mmrs", and "Growing Up".

The version of this video was that released on iTunes is missing the portion where Pete Wentz says "Thank you" to Patrick Stump. On the commentary of the Believers Never Die – Greatest Hits bonus DVD, the band states that this part was left out because of the poor CGI special effects.

It is one of few ballads by Fall Out Boy. As said in an interview, Pete Wentz said that the song was written in thoughts of his friendship with the lead singer Patrick Stump. He wanted to show his fondness towards "one of his best friends in the business". Although the band were on hiatus (which stretched between 2009 and 2013), Wentz and Stump still supported each other's new music releases.

This was the last music video that Fall Out Boy recorded before going on hiatus.

Cameo appearances
"What a Catch, Donnie" features a long line-up of guest artists. Towards the end of the song from 3:45–4:29, lead singers from other Decaydance bands can be heard singing lyrics from other Fall Out Boy singles, behind the main vocals. The songs and artists are as follow:
 3:45 "Grand Theft Autumn/Where Is Your Boy" featuring Gabe Saporta (of Cobra Starship and Midtown).
 3:52 "Sugar, We're Goin Down" (while "Grand Theft Autumn/Where Is Your Boy" fades) featuring Travie McCoy (of Gym Class Heroes).
 4:00 "Dance, Dance" (while "Sugar, We're Goin Down" fades) featuring Brendon Urie (of Panic! at the Disco).
 4:08 "This Ain't a Scene, It's an Arms Race" (while "Dance, Dance" fades) featuring Doug Neumann, the general management for Crush Management, which claims Decaydance as part of its roster.
 4:15 "Thnks fr th Mmrs" featuring Alexander DeLeon (of The Cab).
 4:22 "Growing Up" (while "Thnks fr th Mmrs" fades) featuring William Beckett (of The Academy Is...).

At 3:00 Elvis Costello sings the overture "I will never end up like him, behind my back I already am..." of Fall Out Boy's song "Headfirst Slide into Cooperstown on a Bad Bet". On the band's Believers Never Die – Greatest Hits album, Fall Out Boy vocalist Patrick Stump sings the line on the song as the legal agreements were not made in time.

The title of the song is a reference to Donny Hathaway. His writing partner, Roberta Flack, is mentioned several times throughout the song.

Chart performance

References

External links
 Fall Out Boy official website

2008 singles
Fall Out Boy songs
2000s ballads
Songs about loneliness
Songs about suicide
Songs written by Pete Wentz
Songs written by Patrick Stump
2008 songs
Island Records singles
Song recordings produced by Neal Avron
Rock ballads
Music videos directed by Alan Ferguson (director)